Zdeslav Vrdoljak (born 15 March 1971) is a water polo player from Croatia, who was a member of the national team that won the silver medal at the 1996 Summer Olympics in Atlanta, Georgia. He was born in Split in what was then Yugoslavia in 1971.

See also
 List of Olympic medalists in water polo (men)
 List of world champions in men's water polo
 List of World Aquatics Championships medalists in water polo

References

External links
 

1971 births
Living people
Water polo players from Split, Croatia
Croatian male water polo players
Olympic silver medalists for Croatia in water polo
Water polo players at the 1996 Summer Olympics
Water polo players at the 2008 Summer Olympics
World Aquatics Championships medalists in water polo
Medalists at the 1996 Summer Olympics